Varu may refer to:
 Varu, Iran (disambiguation), places in Iran
 Varu (Mawal), a village in Pune district, India
 Varalaxmi Sarathkumar, an actress
 Varu (surname) - a surname of Indian origin